Marion Anthony Zioncheck (born  Marjan Antoni Zajaczek; December 5, 1900 – August 7, 1936) was an American politician who served as a member of the United States House of Representatives from 1933 until his death. He represented  as a Democrat.

Having struggled with his mental health during his term in Congress, Zioncheck committed suicide by autodefenestration in August 1936.

Early life
Zioncheck was born Marjan Antoni Zajaczek in Kęty, Austria-Hungary (now in Poland), the son of Clemens and Frances (née Wlodiga) Zajaccek (later Zioncheck). His family immigrated to the United States in 1904, and they settled in Seattle, Washington. He attended the University of Washington where in 1927 he became president of the student government (ASUW). 

He also earned a law degree from the University of Washington while earning recognition as a left-wing leader in the Democratic Party and the Washington Commonwealth Federation. The Washington Commonwealth Federation would support his election to Congress in the 1932 election.

Congress 
As a U.S. Representative, Zioncheck was known mostly for ardently championing  Franklin D. Roosevelt's New Deal policies. But his tireless work on behalf of the New Deal often was overshadowed by his many personal escapades, which included dancing in fountains and driving on the White House lawn. Beset by the press and by critics of Roosevelt's policies, Zioncheck became depressed and stated that he would not seek reelection to a third term in 1936. In his diary entry for April 30, 1936, Secretary of the Interior  Harold L. Ickes recounted how Zioncheck had asked him to officiate at a wedding with his fiancée, Rubye Louise Nix. Ickes demurred, saying that he had no authority to do so; he was aware of Zioncheck's reputation and simply did not want to get involved. Ultimately, Zioncheck went to Annapolis, Maryland for the wedding and San Juan, Puerto Rico for his honeymoon. On August 1, Zioncheck's friend and ally, King County Prosecutor Warren Magnuson, took him at his word regarding his retirement plans and filed to run for Zioncheck's House seat.

Zioncheck antics attracted attention. The United Press later described him as having become a "national joke".

Stay at mental hospital

On May 30, 1936, Zioncheck's wife left him after an argument during a party at their apartment. On June 1, he became frantic and searched Washington, D.C. for her. He was arrested later that day on a lunacy warrant. He was confined in Gallinger Municipal Hospital Psychopathic Ward, during which his wife returned to him. Doctors blamed overwork and his hectic lifestyle.

He was later transferred to a private facility in Towson, Maryland, but escaped and fled to Washington, where he received congressional immunity.

Suicide
Zioncheck died after plummeting to the sidewalk from a window of his office on the fifth floor of the Arctic Building, at 3rd Avenue and Cherry Street in downtown Seattle, on August 7, 1936. He struck the pavement directly in front of a car occupied by his wife. A note was found; it read, "My only hope in life was to improve the condition of an unfair economic system that held no promise to those that all the wealth of even a decent chance to survive let alone live." This was an instance of suicide by autodefenestration.

Zioncheck was mourned at his early death; both the University of Washington and Boeing closed down for half a day in his honor. He is buried in Evergreen Washelli Memorial Park in Seattle.

His widow, as Rubye Nix Wilson, would later become a well-known artist, and was exhibited at the Museum of Modern Art and the Kennedy Center.

Legacy 
Zioncheck is the subject of an unpublished book-length poem by Grant Cogswell, entitled Ode to Congressman Marion Zioncheck. The story of Zioncheck, and Cogswell's obsession with him, is detailed in Phil Campbell's 2005 book Zioncheck for President: A True Story of Idealism and Madness in American Politics (Nation Books). The option to make Campbell's book into a feature film was purchased in 2007 by producer/director Stephen Gyllenhaal.

The Ballad of Marion Ziocheck, released by indie musician Left at London on her 2021 album T.I.A.P.F.Y.H., recounts the story of Zioncheck's life.

See also 
 List of United States Congress members who died in office (1900–1949)

References

External links 

 

1900 births
1936 deaths
1936 suicides
Austro-Hungarian emigrants to the United States
University of Washington alumni
American politicians of Polish descent
American politicians who committed suicide
Deaths by defenestration
Suicides by jumping in the United States
Suicides in Washington (state)
University of Washington School of Law alumni
Democratic Party members of the United States House of Representatives from Washington (state)
20th-century American politicians